Lemuel Tyrone "Limbo" Parks (born March 21, 1965) is a former American football player who played as an offensive guard for four years at college level with a short stint in professional football. He played college football for Coffeyville Community College and the University of Arkansas. He had a three-game stint as a replacement player for San Francisco 49ers of the National Football League (NFL) during the 1987 NFL season.

Early years
Parks was born in Kansas City, Missouri. He attended Raytown South High School in Raytown, Missouri.

College career
Parks first played college football at Coffeyville Community College, where he was part of the Red Ravens 1983 National Junior College Athletic Association (NJCAA) National Championship team. In 1984, Parks was named an NJCAA Football All-American.

In 1985, Parks transferred to the University of Arkansas. Parks earned All-SWC honors in 1986.

Professional career
By the beginning of the 1987 NFL season, Parks was working as a Pizza Hut delivery driver. With the majority of NFL players choosing to walk out after the second game of the season, Parks became one of a large number of replacement players, joining the San Francisco 49ers. He made three appearances for the team before the regular players returned for the sixth game. The three games, against the New York Giants, the Atlanta Falcons and the St. Louis Cardinals were all wins.

References

External links
Just Sports Stats

Living people
1965 births
Players of American football from Kansas City, Missouri
American football offensive guards
African-American players of American football
Coffeyville Red Ravens football players
Arkansas Razorbacks football players
San Francisco 49ers players
National Football League replacement players
21st-century African-American people
20th-century African-American sportspeople